James Bracey (born 17 September 1984) is an Australian television sports presenter.

He currently presents the sport on Nine News Sydney from Sunday to Thursday, having succeeded Cameron Williams who left the network suddenly in March 2022 before being named Williams' permanent replacement in May 2022.

Career
Bracey began his television career as a sports reporter and presenter at Sky News Australia where he commenced working following his graduation from the University of Newcastle in 2005.  From January 2013 to December 2016, he hosted SportsNight with James Bracey on the network.

He then joined the Nine Network and has since anchored much of its sports coverage including the National Rugby League, the Australian Open and the Presidents Cup.  Bracey has also hosted Sports Sunday and 100% Footy.  He also filled in for Erin Molan as host of The Footy Show during her maternity leave in 2018.

With the announcement that Bracey would be replacing Cameron Williams as sports presenter on Nine News, it was also announced he would be stepping down as host of Sports Sunday to make way for new host Roz Kelly who was also named as the sports presenter for the Friday and Saturday editions of Nine News.

Controversies
While working at Sky News Australia, Bracey was accused of making an inappropriate gesture about Jim Wilson when it appeared he was mimicking oral sex when a studio shot of him was accidentally put to air while Wilson was talking during a live cross on Sportsline. Sky News director of news and programming Ian Ferguson said he wanted to "correct misinformation" which had circulated on social media following the mishap and confirmed Bracey was coughing.  Wilson, guest Jimmy Smith and sports editor Paul Gregg all confirmed Bracey had been coughing uncontrollably when he unexpectedly appeared on screen and was not making a rude gesture about Wilson.

See also

List of Nine Network presenters

References

External Links 

Australian sports broadcasters

1984 births
Living people

Australian television presenters
Nine News presenters
Sky News Australia reporters and presenters